Liu Chuyu (劉楚玉) (died 2 January 466), often known by her title Princess Shanyin (山陰公主), although her title at death was the greater title of Princess Kuaiji (會稽公主), was a princess of the Chinese Liu Song dynasty. She was a daughter of Emperor Xiaowu.

Life
Liu Chuyu was the oldest daughter among the six children of Emperor Xiaowu's wife Empress Wang Xianyuan, and her birth date is not known. During her father's reign, her father appointed her the Princess Shanyin and married her to He Ji (何戢), a son of his official He Yan (何偃); He Ji was also the father of He Jingying, who would later become an empress of the Southern Qi dynasty.  

After her father's death in July 464, her full younger brother Liu Ziye became emperor (as Emperor Qianfei). She became one of the people who often attended him while he visited places outside the palace.  On one occasion, she told him:
"While our genders are different, we are born of the same father.  However, you have more than 10,000 women in your palaces, and I only have one husband, and this is unfair."
In response, Emperor Qianfei selected 30 young handsome men for her, calling them her mianshou (面首, literally meaning "prime faces"), for them to be her lovers. From this point on in Chinese history, mianshou became a term for women's male lovers, often referring to lovers of honored women.  He also promoted her to the greater title of Princess Kuaiji.

However, Liu Chuyu was not content, and when she saw how Emperor Qianfei's mid-level official Chu Yuan was young and handsome, she requested Emperor Qianfei to give her Chu as a lover. Emperor Qianfei agreed. Chu was ordered to attend to her for more than 10 days, and she tempted him throughout that period. Ultimately, Chu refused to have sexual relations with her, and she released him.

In January 466, after Emperor Qianfei was assassinated by his attendant Shou Jizhi (壽寂之), his uncle Liu Yu the Prince of Xiangdong became emperor (as Emperor Ming).  Even before he actually took the throne, however, he issued an edict in the name of Liu Chuyu's grandmother Grand Empress Dowager Lu Huinan, condemning her for her immorality and her other younger brother Liu Zishang (劉子尚) the Prince of Yuzhang of violence, and ordering them both to commit suicide.

References 

Liu Song dynasty people
446 births
465 deaths
Chinese princesses
5th-century Chinese women
5th-century Chinese people
Suicides in Liu Song